CTK CiTylinK was an airline based in Accra, Ghana.

Background
CTK offered Executive Air Charters, Air Ambulance, Aerial Photography services in West Africa. They provided training and rating courses on all aircraft in the CTK fleet.

CTK Maintenance provided all maintenance for SAAB, LET, Cessna, Beechcraft and Turbo Thrush aircraft. Services are also available for other aircraft users and operators. CTK Maintenance has the only NICAD battery service station available in Ghana.

History
CTK Citylink had been in existence for 16 years and was the oldest operating airline in Ghana. Scheduled domestic flights in Ghana were introduced in 1994 under the name CiTylinK Airlines. Commercial flights were suspended in August 2012.

Sale
CTK has announced that 49.9% of the airline will be acquired by Egyptair in the near future.

Former destinations

Accra - Kotoka International Airport
Kumasi - Kumasi Airport
Sunyani - Sunyani Airport
Takoradi - Takoradi Airport
Tamale - Tamale Airport

Fleet

The CTK – CiTylinK fleet included the following aircraft:
1 Beechcraft Baron
2 Cessna 172
1 Cessna 175
1 Cessna 206
1 Cessna 414
1 Hawker 900XP

References

External links

Defunct airlines of Ghana
Airlines established in 1994
Airlines disestablished in 2013
Ghanaian companies established in 1994